Lumbini is a Buddhist pilgrimage site in Nepal, regarded as the birthplace of the Buddha. The name may also refer to:

Lumbini Gardens, a public park in Bangalore, India
Lumbini Natural Park, a Buddhist temple in Berastagi, Indonesia
Lumbini Park, a public park in Hyderabad, India
Lumbini Sanskritik, a municipality in Nepal
Lumbini Zone, one of the former administrative zones of Nepal

See also
Lumphini (disambiguation)